Thanos is a supervillain appearing in American comic books published by Marvel Comics. Created by writer-artist Jim Starlin, the character first appeared in The Invincible Iron Man #55 (cover date February 1973). An Eternal–Deviant warlord from the moon Titan, Thanos is regarded as one of the most powerful beings in the Marvel Universe. He has clashed with many heroes including the Avengers, the Guardians of the Galaxy, the Fantastic Four, the Eternals, and the X-Men.

In creating Thanos, Starlin drew inspiration from Jack Kirby's New Gods series for DC Comics, particularly the character of Darkseid. Thanos is usually portrayed as a villain, although many stories depict him as believing his actions to be justified. Perhaps the character's best-known storyline is The Infinity Gauntlet (1991), the culmination of several story arcs that see him gather the six Infinity Gems and use them to kill half of the universe's population, including many of its heroes, to woo Mistress Death, the living embodiment of death in the Marvel Universe. Although these events were later undone, the storyline has remained one of the most popular published by Marvel.

Debuting in the Bronze Age of comic books, the character has appeared in almost five decades of Marvel publications, as well as many media adaptations, including animated television series and video games.

In the Marvel Cinematic Universe, the character was first played by Damion Poitier in the film The Avengers (2012) and then by Josh Brolin in Guardians of the Galaxy (2014), Avengers: Age of Ultron (2015), Avengers: Infinity War (2018), Avengers: Endgame (2019), and the first season of the animated series What If...? (2021).

Origin
Writer-artist Jim Starlin conceived of Thanos of Titan during college psychology classes. As Starlin described:

Starlin has admitted the character's look was influenced by Jack Kirby's Darkseid:

Publication history
Thanos's first appearance was in The Invincible Iron Man #55 (February 1973), featuring a story by Jim Starlin that was co-scripted by Mike Friedrich. The storyline from that issue continued through Captain Marvel #25–33 (bi-monthly: March 1973 – Jan. 1974), Marvel Feature #12 (Nov. 1973), Daredevil #107 (Jan. 1974), and Avengers #125 (July 1974). He returned in an extended storyline that spanned Strange Tales #178–181 (Feb.–Aug. 1975), Warlock #9-11 (Oct. 1975 – Jan. 1976), Marvel Team Up #55 (March 1977), and the 1977 Annuals for Avengers and Marvel Two-in-One (Thanos does not actually appear until the end of Warlock #9). He was also featured in a short backup story in Logan's Run #6 (June 1977) and had a small role in the Death of Captain Marvel graphic novel (April 1982).

The character was revived in Silver Surfer vol. 3, #34 (Feb. 1990) and guest-starred until issue #59 (November 1991), while simultaneously appearing  in The Thanos Quest #1–2 (Sept.–Oct. 1990) and The Infinity Gauntlet #1–6 (July–Dec. 1991). After an appearance in Spider-Man #17 (Dec. 1991), Thanos had a recurring role in Warlock and the Infinity Watch #1–42 (Feb. 1992 – Aug. 1995). This was followed by crossover appearances in Infinity War #1–6 (June – Nov. 1992), Infinity Crusade #1–6 (June – Nov. 1993), Silver Surfer vol. 3, #86–88 (Nov. 1993 – Jan. 1994), Warlock Chronicles #6–8, Thor #468–471 (Nov. 1993 – Feb. 1994), Namor The Sub-Mariner #44 (Nov. 1993), Secret Defenders #11–14 (Jan.–April 1994), Cosmic Powers #1–6 (March–July 1994), and Cosmic Powers Unlimited #1 (May 1995).

Thanos appeared in a connected storyline in Ka-Zar vol. 2, #4–11 (Aug. 1997 – March 1998), Ka-Zar Annual (1997), and the X-Man and Hulk Annual (1998), before featuring in Thor vol. 2, #21–25 (March–July 2000) and the 2000 Annual. The character was next used in Captain Marvel vol. 4, #17–19 (June–Aug. 2001), Avengers: Celestial Quest #1–8 (Nov. 2001 – June 2002), Infinity Abyss #1–6 (Aug.–Oct. 2002) and Marvel: The End #1–6 (May–Aug 2003).

In 2004 Thanos received an eponymous title that ran for 12 issues. In 2006, the character played an important role in Annihilation: Silver Surfer #1–4 (June – Sept. 2006) and Annihilation #1–6 (Oct. 2006 – March 2007). The character was re-introduced in Guardians of the Galaxy vol. 2, #24–25 (April–May 2010) and played a major role in The Thanos Imperative: Ignition (June 2010) and The Thanos Imperative #1–6 (July–Dec. 2010).

The character returned in Avengers Assemble #1 (March 2012). A mini-series titled Thanos: Son of Titan by Joe Keatinge was planned for publication in August 2012, but was cancelled.

The character's origin was expanded in the five-issue Thanos Rising miniseries by Jason Aaron and Simone Bianchi which was published monthly beginning in April 2013. Later that same year, Thanos played a central role in the Infinity miniseries written by Jonathan Hickman and drawn by Jim Cheung, Jerome Opeña, and Dustin Weaver.

In May 2014, Jim Starlin and Ron Lim worked together on the one-shot Thanos Annual, which is a prelude to a new trilogy of original graphic novels. The first, Thanos: The Infinity Revelation, was released the following August. Beginning in February 2015, Starlin also penned a four-issue miniseries titled Thanos vs. Hulk, which was set prior to the graphic novels. The second installment in the trilogy, Thanos: The Infinity Relativity, was released in June, 2015. The third graphic novel, Thanos: The Infinity Finale, as well as the connected mini-series The Infinity Entity were published in 2016.

At the same time Starlin was writing these graphic novels and tie-ins, the character also appeared in New Avengers #23–24 (Oct–Nov 2014), Guardians of the Galaxy vol. 3, #18–20 (Oct–Dec 2014), Legendary Star-Lord #4 (Dec 2014), a six-issue miniseries titled Thanos: A God Up There Listening (Dec 2014), Avengers vol. 5, #40–41 (Mar–Apr 2015), and Deadpool vol. 3, #45 ("#250") (Jun 2015). Thanos also played a major role in the five-issue miniseries The Infinity Gauntlet vol. 2, (July 2015 – Jan 2016), a tie-in of the cross-over Secret Wars (2015).

In 2017, as part of Marvel NOW!, Thanos received his own solo title written by Jeff Lemire and drawn by Mike Deodato. After 11 issues, Donny Cates and Geoff Shaw took over as the creative team. This storyline crossed over with Donny Cates' Cosmic Ghost Rider storyline.

In 2021, Thanos was later reintroduced as a primary antagonist in the comic series Eternals vol. 5, #1-12, by the writer Kieron Gillen and artist Esad Ribić, and plays a prominent role in exploring Eternals mythos and retcons.

Fictional character biography
Thanos was born on Saturn's moon Titan as the son of Eternals A'lars and Sui-San, the grandson of Kronos, the nephew of Zuras, and the grandnephew of Oceanus and Uranos. His brother is Eros of Titan. Thanos carries the Deviants gene, and as such, shares the physical appearance of the Eternals' cousin race. Shocked by his appearance and the belief that he would destroy all life in the universe, Sui-San went insane and attempted to kill him, but she was stopped by A'lars. During his school years, Thanos was a pacifist and would only play with his brother Eros and pets. By adolescence, Thanos had become fascinated with nihilism and entropy, worshipping and eventually falling in love with the physical embodiment of Mistress Death.

At some point in his youth, a younger Thanos was sent to Earth by Mephisto where he fought the prehistoric Avengers where he was repelled.

As an adult, Thanos augmented his physical strength and powers through his superior scientific knowledge using a combination of mysticism and cybernetic enhancements. He also attempted to create a new life for himself by siring many children as well as becoming a pirate. He finds no fulfillment in either until he is visited again by Mistress Death, for whom he murders his offspring and his pirate captain.

Wishing to impress Mistress Death, Thanos gathers an army of villainous aliens and begins a nuclear bombardment of Titan that kills millions of his race. Seeking universal power in the form of the Cosmic Cube, Thanos travels to Earth. Prior to landing, his vessel destroys a nearby car as a family witnesses his arrival. Unbeknownst to Thanos, two of the family members in the vehicle survive: the father's spirit is preserved by the Titanian cosmic entity Kronos and is given a new form as Drax the Destroyer while the daughter is found by Thanos's father, Mentor, and is raised to become the heroine Moondragon. Thanos eventually locates the Cube, and also attracts the attention of Mistress Death. Willing the Cube to make him omnipotent, Thanos then discards the Cube. He imprisons Kronos and taunts Kree hero Captain Marvel, who, with the aid of superhero team the Avengers and ISAAC (a super-computer based on Titan), is eventually able to defeat Thanos by destroying the Cube.

Thanos later comes to the aid of Adam Warlock in a war against the Magus and his religious empire. During the process, he ends up adopting Gamora in order to use her as his assassin and kill Adam Warlock before becoming Magus. During this alliance Thanos cultivates a plan to reunite with Mistress Death, and secretly siphons off the energies of Warlock's Soul Gem, combining these with the power of the other Infinity Gems to create a weapon capable of destroying a star. Warlock summons the Avengers and Captain Marvel to stop Thanos, although the plan is foiled when Thanos kills Warlock. The Titan regroups and captures the heroes, who are freed by Spider-Man and the Thing. Thanos is finally stopped by Warlock, whose spirit emerges from the Soul Gem and turns the Titan to stone. Thanos's spirit eventually reappears to accompany a dying Captain Marvel's soul into the realm of Death.

During the "Infinity Saga" storyline, Thanos is eventually resurrected and collects the Infinity Gems once again. He uses the gems to create the Infinity Gauntlet, making himself omnipotent, and erases half the living things in the universe to prove his love to Death. This act and several other acts are soon undone by Nebula and Adam Warlock. Warlock reveals that Thanos has always allowed himself to be defeated because the Titan secretly knows he is not worthy of ultimate power. Thanos joins Warlock as part of the Infinity Watch and helps him to defeat first his evil and then good personas, and cure Thor of "warrior Madness".

Thanos later recruits a team of Earth-bound super-villains and puts them under the field leadership of Geatar in a mission to capture an ancient robot containing the obscure knowledge of a universal library and extract its data. Thanos uses information from the robot to plot against and battle Tyrant, the first creation of Galactus turned destroyer. When trapped in an alternate dimension, Thanos employs the aid of the brother of Ka-Zar, Parnival Plunder and later the Hulk to escape, although both attempts are unsuccessful. Thanos is eventually freed and comes into conflict with Thor, aligning himself with Mangog in a scheme to obtain powerful mystical and cosmic talismans which will allow him to destroy all life in the universe, and during their battles Thanos decimates the planet Rigel-3.

Thanos then uses the heroes Thor and Genis-Vell (Captain Marvel's son) against the death god Walker, who attempts to woo Mistress Death and then destroy the entity after being rejected. Thanos then devises a plan to become the All-Father of a new pantheon of gods created by himself. Thanos, however, finds himself opposed by the Avengers' former member Mantis and her son Quoi, who apparently is destined to be the Celestial Messiah. Thanos abandons this plan after having to unite with Mistress Death to destroy the "Rot", a cosmic aberration in deep space caused by Thanos's incessant love for Death. Thanos also once conducted extensive research on genetics, studying many of the universe's heroes and villains before cloning them, and gene-spliced his own DNA into the subjects. Although he later abandons the project, five clones survive, being versions of Professor X, Iron Man, Gladiator, Doctor Strange, and Galactus respectively. A sixth and unnamed version of Thanos also appears, and it is revealed the incarnations of Thanos encountered in the past by Thor and Ka-Zar were actually clones. The true Thanos – with the aid of Adam Warlock, Gamora, Pip the Troll, Spider-Man, Captain Marvel, and Dr. Strange – destroys the remaining clones.

When the ancient Egyptian pharaoh Akhenaten uses a source of cosmic power, the Heart of the Universe, to seize power in present-day Earth (killing most of Earth's heroes in the process), Thanos uses a time-travel stratagem to defeat him. Thanos then uses the Heart of the Universe to reverse Akhenaten's actions and was also compelled to correct a flaw in the universe, for which Mistress Death kisses him, and speaks to him for the first time. Changed by the experience, Thanos advises confidant Adam Warlock he will no longer seek universal conquest.

Thanos decides to atone for the destruction of Rigel-3, and agrees to aid a colony of Rigellians in evacuating their planet before Galactus can consume it. During the course of this mission Thanos learns Galactus is collecting the Infinity Gems in an effort to end his unyielding hunger. Thanos later learns Galactus is being manipulated into releasing a multiversal threat called Hunger, which feeds on entire universes. Despite opposition from Thanos, Galactus unwittingly frees the entity, and when its intentions are revealed, the pair team up and attempt to destroy it.

En route to the Kyln, an intergalactic prison, Thanos meets Death for the first time since re-building existence with the Heart of the Universe. Death claims to be worth wooing, but says Thanos must offer something other than death. At the Kyln Thanos encounters Peter Quill, who has retired himself from the role of Star-Lord, and the Strontian warrior Gladiator of the Shi'ar Empire, who are both prisoners, as well as the Beyonder, who has been rendered amnesiac by its choice to assume a humanoid female form. Thanos battles the Beyonder, causing its mind to shut down and leaving its power trapped within a comatose physical form. Thanos then instructs the Kyln officers to keep the Beyonder on life support indefinitely in order to prevent the entity from being reborn. The destruction frees Thanos and his fellow inmates, and he finds himself accompanied by the chaos-mite Skreet in his plans to leave the remains of the prison. He discovers, however, that the destruction wrought by the battle with the Beyonder has freed the last prisoner brought in by Peter Quill before he gave up the title of Star-Lord: the Fallen One, revealed to be the true first Herald of Galactus, who had been held in a container deep in the Kyln. Thanos defeats the former Herald and places him under complete mental control. He later appears in Wisconsin attempting to charge a weapon called the Pyramatrix with the life force of everyone on Earth until he is defeated by Squirrel Girl. After the battle, Uatu the Watcher appears and confirms to Squirrel Girl that she defeated the real Thanos, not a clone or copy.

During the Annihilation War, Thanos allies himself with the genocidal villain Annihilus. When the Annihilation Wave destroys the Kyln, Thanos sends the Fallen to check on the status of the Beyonder, whose mortal form he finds has perished. Before the Fallen can report back to Thanos it encounters Tenebrous and Aegis: two of Galactus's ancient foes. Thanos convinces Tenebrous and Aegis to join the Annihilation Wave in order to get revenge on Galactus, and they subsequently defeat the World Devourer and the Silver Surfer. Annihilus desires the secret of the Power Cosmic and asks Thanos to study Galactus. Once Thanos learns Annihilus's true goal is to use the Power Cosmic to destroy all life and remain the sole survivor, he decides to free Galactus. Drax the Destroyer kills Thanos before he can do so but discovers that Thanos had placed a failsafe device to allow Silver Surfer to free Galactus in the event that Annihilus betrayed him. During a climactic battle with Annihilus, Nova is near death and sees Thanos standing with Mistress Death.

During "The Thanos Imperative" storyline, a cocoon protected by the Universal Church of Truth is revealed to be hiding Thanos, who has been chosen by Oblivion to be the new Avatar of Death. Resurrected before his mind could be fully formed, Thanos goes on a mindless rampage before being captured by the Guardians of the Galaxy. Thanos pretends to aid the Guardians against the invading Cancerverse, and after discovering its origin kills an alternate version of Mar-Vell, the self-proclaimed Avatar of Life. This causes the collapse of the Cancerverse, and Nova sacrifices himself in an attempt to contain Thanos inside the imploding reality. Thanos escapes and returns to Earth seeking an artificial cosmic cube. He forms an incarnation of the criminal group Zodiac to retrieve it, but he is defeated by the Avengers and the Guardians of the Galaxy and remanded to the custody of the  Elders of the Universe.

During the "Infinity" storyline, Thanos soon invades Earth again after being informed that most of the Avengers have temporarily left the planet. He launches an assault on Attilan, which he offers to spare in exchange for the deaths of all Inhumans between the ages of 16 and 22. Black Bolt later informs the Illuminati that the true purpose of the invasion is to find and kill Thane, an Eternal/Inhuman hybrid that Thanos had secretly fathered years earlier. Thanos is trapped in a pocket limbo of stasis by his son. Thanos is freed by Namor and was among the villains that joined his Cabal to destroy other worlds. Thanos later meets his end on Battleworld, where he is easily killed by God Emperor Doom during an attempted insurrection.

Investigating a temporal anomaly on Titan during "The Infinity Conflict", Thanos finds Pip the Troll and an older Eros who has come from the future. Eros tells him about an enemy made out darkness that will destroy Thanos in the future. Eros and Thanos craft a plan, but when they go to implement it Thanos is confronted by his future self who tells him to alter the plan to ensure his safety. The future Thanos then takes control of the past Thanos' body. Under the control of his future self, Thanos began searching through ancient temples and sites to find something that would allow him to eventually become like his future. Through his journey he was also forced to kill Adam Warlock who might interfere with his future's plan. After being unable to locate Eros, his future self tells Thanos that Eros was extremely important to his cosmic masterwork. Then after locating a moving comet Thanos goes to the comet which contained a treasure more powerful than the Infinity Gems. Despite the speed of comet being enough to immediately vaporize any being Thanos was able to get it since he "existed outside the norm". With this artifact Thanos was able to absorb every cosmic being that exists in his universe, eventually facing Eternity and Infinity. Despite their best effort Thanos defeats them and absorbs the two beings. He then merges with his future self finally taking the battle to the Living Tribunal and the One Above All. Facing the One Above All and the Living Tribunal, Thanos' future self went on to absorb both of them becoming the entirety of the Multiverse. As the multiverse began dying, while his future self searched for Eros, present Thanos was locked away within his future's psyche not allowed to interfere. In a desperate ditch effort to prevent all of this Eros, alongside Pip, travel to different points of Thanos' past and tell him he is not alone and that he is loved. However, it is all in vain as Thanos simply did not care, but these temporal paradoxes did allow present Thanos to use that little access of his future's power to talk to Eros through his past selves. He directs Eros and Pip to his future's psyche and had Eros free him, but unfortunately this allows future Thanos to finally find Eros and had him absorbed inside his universe. Then Adam Warlock came and refuses to free Thanos because he would end up as Eros and tells Thanos that trust would be the only thing that would stop future Thanos. As his future self saw that existence was just a never-endless cycle which trapped all beings decided to commit suicide and "free" everyone from this "torture". Thankfully, Kang prevented Eros from going to talk to Thanos' past selves which allowed him to avoid capture. This caused future Thanos to get distracted which allowed present Thanos to take control and reset everything prior to his future machinations, while erasing his future in the process.

Thanos is unintentionally brought back to the universe by Galactus.

When Thanos prepares to raid a Project Pegasus facility to steal a Cosmic Cube during the "Civil War II" storyline, he is ambushed and defeated by a team of Avengers who were tipped off by a vision from Ulysses Cain. During their battle, he mortally wounds War Machine and critically injures She-Hulk. After his defeat, he is imprisoned in the Triskelion, and manipulates Anti-Man into facilitating his escape. Thanos goes on a killing spree, but Black Panther, Blue Marvel and Monica Rambeau are able to stop him by devising a device that blocks the electrical synapses in his brain.

Thanos somehow later recovers during the "Thanos Returns" story and escapes captivity, and reclaims his Black Order forces from Corvus Glaive. After retaking command of his Black Quadrant outpost, Thanos discovers that he is dying. Thanos tries to force his father, Mentor, to find a cure for his malady, but kills him when he is unable to. Soon after Thanos would be battered and detained by the Shi'ar Imperial Guard after he invaded the very planet station of his father's facility sitting in their territory. A quick jump into the future shows Thanos's estranged son Thane having bested his mad father with the personification of death at his side. Presently locked within a maximum security cosmic Alcatraz, Thanos sits alone within a cell as his sickness ravages his body. All while being mocked by its prison warden whom he lured into a false sense of security in order to escape; ripping off his arm for escape access and murdering half his personal staff in a bid for freedom. Having narrowly escaped his imprisonment before its self-destruction, Thanos retreats to a hidden outpost where a roving mercenary colony loyal only to him was once stationed. Only to find it decimated at the hand of the new lover of Mistress Death; who reveals that she had stricken her former avatar with his fatal sickness, being his son Thane, now boasting the power of the Phoenix Force. Whom under her coaxing, had banished the mad titan back to the decimated Moon of Titan now entirely stripped of his godlike powers. For the next few months, Thanos would survive alone and all but powerless in the ruins of his home city. Surviving off the flesh of mutated vermin and being accosted by local scavengers who preyed upon him in his weakened condition, he is soon picked up by the unlikely crew of Thane's betrayed cohorts Tryco Slatterus, his adopted daughter Nebula and his brother Eros of Titan. Having heard of their plight, the three were dismayed to find Thanos stripped of all he was and had ever been; his second daughter only agreeing to come along so she could kill her father, immediately assaulted him. Starfox was able to preempt her attempt at patricide while inviting his wayward tyrant of a brother aboard their vessel. Thanos mentioned the only way for him to be relieved of his mortality was to seek out the God Quarry heralded by The Witches of Infinity. Starfox initially wrote this off as fable and folklore. Now on the path to the cosmic coven set at the edge of the known universe, Thanos and crew stop short of a black hole, knowing full well that it is where the witches make their home. The Mad Titan jumps into the pinhole of nothingness alongside his brother, whom not trusting his butcherous sibling with the supposed infinite power of said collective; having survived the crushing force of the singularity they dove into, Thanos and Eros are greeted by the Coven at the godly graveyard. Thanos demands the three that are one to return his godhood to him. Starfox tries his best to charm the enchantresses only to be rebuked by them, much to Thanos's joy when they prematurely aged him. Seeing as it was neither their place to destroy nor turn away those seeking them, The Witches profess the only way for the warlord to be made whole again was to climb down into the God Quarry and await a trial that would test his soul. Immediately after setting foot within the graveyard of old gods, Thanos is subsumed into the bedrock within which they rest. As his journey of the core being commenced, Thanos's trial began with him as leader of earth and the universes greatest champions, the Avengers. But he is unable to escape the nagging feeling that he has forgotten something, until the quarry itself wearing the guise of Falcon reminds him of who he used to be; tempting him to live as a hero and a man at peace for the first time in his immortal life. But Thanos laughs maniacally as he coldly rebukes such a path, ruthlessly killing his would be friends and allies while choosing to remain whom he always was. His cosmic might returned to him, Thanos is freed from the God Quarry, wherein he immediately accosts his brother Eros and threatens the coven to release him from their domain so that he might do away with Thane once and for all.

Around the time of the New Thor's appearance, Thanos is approached by a mysterious hooded woman, who proposes an alliance. He tasks her with bringing him the hammer of the deceased Ultimate Thor. The woman fails, but removes her disguise to reveal herself as Hela, the Norse goddess of death. She tells Thanos that she needs his help to reclaim Hel, and in exchange, offers to give him the one thing he has been searching for his entire life: death. After this, the two kiss.

Some time after his battle with Thane during the "Thanos Wins" story, Thanos travels to the Chitauri homeworld. However, upon subjugating the planet, he is attacked by a being identified only as The Rider, who captures Thanos and uses a piece of the fractured Time Stone to bring Thanos millions of years into the future, where he encounters an elderly version of himself who has destroyed nearly all life in the universe. At first, Thanos believes it to be some sort of trick, but is convinced once the future Thanos utters the name Dione, which Thanos's mother had planned to name him before she went insane. King Thanos reveals he needs his younger self's assistance to defeat the Fallen One, the last being left in the Universe, so that he may finally reunite with Death. The Fallen One soon arrives, revealed to be a darkened Silver Surfer armed with the hordes of Annihilus and the deceased Thor's Mjolnir, using the latter to swiftly kill the Rider. The Surfer is distracted by the feral Hulk that Thanos kept chained in his basement, allowing the two Thanos to kill him using Surtur's Twilight Sword. Upon the Surfer's death, Death arrives, and Thanos realizes the true reason that King Thanos brought him into the future: so that King Thanos can finally die, reasoning that if he must die, it can only be at the hands of himself. At first, Thanos is more than happy to oblige his future counterpart's request, but quickly stops, disappointed at how pathetic and submissive his older self has become. Resolving to never become as pathetic and complacent as King Thanos has become, Thanos uses the fragment of the Time Stone and the Power Cosmic left in the Surfer's corpse to return to the present day. As the future begins to crumble around him, King Thanos realizes that his younger self has taken the steps necessary to ensure that this timeline will never take place. As he fades into nothingness, King Thanos asks Death what his younger self did, to which she simply responds "he won."

During the "Infinity Wars" storyline, Thanos later discovers that the Infinity Stones are being collected once again and begins plotting to reassemble his gauntlet. However, he is assaulted by Requiem, whom he apparently recognizes, and is quickly killed. She then destroys the Infinity Gauntlet and also commands the Chitauri loyal to Thanos to die.

In a prelude to the "A.X.E.: Judgment Day" storyline, Thanos is revived by the Eternals. After receiving a vote from the Uni-Mind, Thanos becomes the Prime Eternal and kills Druig. He has Druig revived and visits Uranos in the Exclusion where Thanos learns the Eternals' three principals. After Druig departs, Uranos gives Thanos an imprint key that enables an armory to access the fail-safe that Uranos put in to destroying the Machine. Thanos is told by the Eternal scientist Domo that his genes deriving from Eternals and Deviants is the reason why the Machine doesn't recognize him as an Eternal. As Thanos fights the Eternals, Druig betrays Thanos and activates the fail-safe in Thanos' armor which causes Thanos to die from his mutation. With Thanos gone, Druig becomes the new Prime Eternal.

Powers and abilities
Thanos is a mutant member of the race of superhumans known as the Titanian Eternals. The character possesses abilities common to the Eternals, but amplified to a higher degree through a combination of his mutant–Eternal heritage, bionic amplification, mysticism, and power bestowed by the abstract entity, Death. Demonstrating enormous superhuman strength, speed, stamina, immortality and invulnerability among other qualities, Thanos can absorb and project vast quantities of cosmic energy, and is capable of telekinesis and telepathy. He can manipulate matter and live indefinitely without food, air or water, cannot die of old age, is immune to all terrestrial diseases, and has high resistance to psychic assaults. Thanos is also an accomplished hand-to-hand combatant, having been trained in the art of war on Titan.

Thanos has proven himself capable of briefly holding his own in battle against Odin, and of blasting Galactus off his feet.

Thanos is a supergenius in virtually all known fields of advanced science and has created technology far exceeding that which is found on contemporary Earth. He often employs a transportation chair capable of space flight, force field projection, teleportation, time travel, and movement through alternate universes. Thanos is also a master strategist and uses several space vessels, at least three under the name "Sanctuary", as a base of operations.

Cultural impact and legacy

Accolades
 In 2014, IGN ranked Thanos 47th in their "Top 100 Comic Book Villains" list.
 In 2016, Complex ranked Thanos 21st in their "25 Greatest Comic Book Villains of All Time" list.
 In 2017, Screen Rant ranked Thanos 10th in their "25 Greatest Comic Book Supervillains Of All Time" list.
 In 2019, IGN ranked Thanos 6th in their "Top 25 Marvel Villains" list.
 In 2021, CBR.com ranked Thanos 2nd in their "15 Most Powerful Eternals" list.
 In 2021, Screen Rant ranked Thanos 8th in their "10 Most Powerful Members Of The Eternals" list
 In 2021, CBR.com ranked Thanos 2nd in their "10 Strongest Characters From Eternals Comics" list.
 In 2022, The Mary Sue ranked Thanos 7th in their "Strongest Marvel Villains" list.
 In 2022, The A.V. Club ranked Thanos 6th in their "28 best Marvel villains" list.
 In 2022, Newsarama ranked Thanos 1st in their "Best Marvel supervillains" list and 6th in their "Best Marvel characters of all time" list.
 In 2022, Screen Rant included Thanos in their "20 Most Powerful Marvel Villains" list.
 In 2022, CBR.com ranked Thanos 1st in their "13 Most Important Marvel Villains" list.

Impact
The Reddit forum /r/ThanosDidNothingWrong, dedicated to sharing theories and memes about the character, went viral in July 2018 when it was announced that half of the forum's subscribers would be banned, mirroring Thanos’ plan to eradicate half of all life in the universe. The number of subscribers rose from 100,000 users in June, to over 700,000 on July 9, leading to over 350,000 users being banned, the largest such banning in Reddit's history. A May 2019 Forbes column posited that "Thanos did nothing wrong" has become a popular internet meme, and that the film Endgame provides some evidence in favor of this view, in particular when Captain America says, "I saw a pod of whales when I was coming over the bridge . . . There's fewer ships, cleaner water." The author notes that given the contemporary extinction crisis driven by human actions, "you could indeed argue that Thanos did nothing wrong -- and in the long run, the villain might have actually saved the world."

Other versions

Amalgam Comics
In the 1996 Amalgam Comics books published jointly by DC Comics and Marvel, Thanos was merged with Darkseid to become "Thanoseid".

Earth X
In the alternate universe limited series Earth X, Thanos dwells in the Realm of the Dead with the entity Death. Additionally, this version's mother was a Skrull, which Death used in combination with her own secret to make him believe that she was his mother. When the deception is revealed, he uses the Ultimate Nullifier on Death.

Heroes Reborn (2021)
In an alternate reality depicted in the "Heroes Reborn" miniseries, Thanos places the Infinity Gems in Infinity Rings and fights Doctor Spectrum.

Kid Thanos
After having witnessed a fight between the prehistoric Avengers and a younger Thanos, an alternate version of Doctor Doom called Doom Supreme is persuaded by Mephisto to put together a variation of the Multiversal Masters of Evil made from the evilest villains in the Multiverse and conquer it while saving Earth-616 for last. One of its recruits is a variation of the younger Thanos called Kid Thanos. Kid Thanos accompanied Doom Supreme in attacking Avengers Mountain. They fought Black Panther, Namor, and Valkyrie up to the point where Avengers Mountain exploded. Afterwards, both of them had spoken with Mephisto and Iron Inquisitor before rejoining with the other Multiversal Masters of Evil members so that they can get back to work.

In a flashback, Kid Thanos was with the Multiversal Masters of Evil when they attacked Earth-91.

Kid Thanos was with the Multiversal Masters of Evil when they attacked an unidentified Earth. Afterwards, they were attacked by Ghost Rider where he used his Hell Charger to knock down Kid Thanos and Hound.

Kid Thanos was with the Multiversal Masters of Evil when they arrived on Earth-616 during prehistoric times. During the fight between the Multiversal Masters of Evil and both Avengers teams, Kid Thanos fights Captain America and Prehistoric Moon Knight. 9 days later, Kid Thanos gets taken over by Black Skull's symbiote upon his defeat. With some power donation from Soldier Supreme of 1943, Kid Starbrand and Reno Phoenix of 1868, Ghost Ronin of 1655, and the Tyrannosaurus Starbrand of 66,000,000 BC, Echo defeats Kid Thanos.

As Kid Thanos finishes recuperating, Mephisto appears as he tells them what happened to Ghost Goblin, King Killmonger, and Black Skull while also mentioning that Doom Supreme and Dark Phoenix have fled. With the corpses of Ghost Goblin, Hound, and King Killmonger as well as the unconscious body of Red Skull near him, Kid Thanos states that he can obtain fresh knowledge of his teammates on his dissection table. Kid Thanos is told by Mephisto that Black Skull isn't dead yet.

Marvel Zombies 2
Thanos features in the limited series Marvel Zombies 2, set in the alternate universe of Earth-2149. Having been "zombified" and recruited into the cosmically powered Galacti, the character is killed by a cosmic-powered Hulk after an altercation over food.

Ultimate Marvel
The Ultimate Marvel imprint title Ultimate Fantastic Four features an alternate universe version of Thanos who is the ruler of Acheron and has a son called Ronan the Accuser who is in possession of a Cosmic Cube, a vast empire consisting of thousands of worlds on another plane of existence.

In other media

Television
 Thanos appears in Silver Surfer, voiced by Gary Krawford. Due to Fox's broadcast standards, this version is depicted as a worshiper of Lady Chaos.
 Thanos appears in The Super Hero Squad Show, voiced by Steve Blum in his first appearance, and by Jim Cummings in all subsequent appearances. 
 Thanos appears in Avengers Assemble and Guardians of the Galaxy, voiced by Isaac C. Singleton Jr.
 Thanos appears in Lego Marvel Super Heroes - Guardians of the Galaxy: The Thanos Threat, voiced again by Isaac C. Singleton Jr.
 Thanos appears in Lego Marvel Super Heroes - Black Panther: Trouble in Wakanda, voiced again by Isaac C. Singleton Jr.

Marvel Cinematic Universe

Thanos appears in the first three phases of the Marvel Cinematic Universe's films, known collectively as the "Infinity Saga", primarily portrayed by Josh Brolin via motion capture. Alternate timeline versions of Thanos also appear in the Disney+ animated series, What If...?, with Brolin reprising the voice role.

Video games
 Thanos appeared as a playable character in Marvel Super Heroes and Marvel vs. Capcom 2, voiced by Andrew Jackson.
 Thanos appears as the final boss in Marvel Super Heroes In War of the Gems.
 Thanos appears as a DLC character in Lego Marvel Super Heroes.
 Thanos appears as a playable character of Lego Marvel's Avengers, voiced again by Isaac C. Singleton Jr.
 Thanos appears as a playable character in Marvel Future Fight.
 Thanos appears as a playable character in Marvel: Contest of Champions.
 Three incarnations of Thanos appear as playable characters in Marvel Puzzle Quest. The first two, based on the comics ("Modern" and "The Mad Titan"), were added to the game in December 2016, while the third, inspired by the MCU incarnation ("Endgame"), was added in April 2019.
 Thanos appears in Guardians of the Galaxy: The Telltale Series, voiced by Jake Hart. This version seeks an ancient artifact called the Eternity Forge, but is killed in battle by the Guardians of the Galaxy.
 Thanos appears as a playable character in Marvel vs. Capcom: Infinite, voiced again by Isaac C. Singleton Jr. He is captured by Ultron Sigma until he is rescued by an alliance of heroes from the Marvel and Capcom universes and aids them in devising a plan to combat Ultron Sigma.
 The MCU incarnation of Thanos appeared in Fortnite Battle Royale as part of Marvel-sponsored Avengers: Infinity War and Avengers: Endgame tie-in events, voiced by archive audio of Josh Brolin.
 The MCU incarnation of Thanos appears in Lego Marvel Super Heroes 2.
 The MCU incarnation of Thanos appears as a boss in the Spider-Man Unlimited Infinity War tie-in update, voiced by Kyle Hebert.
 Thanos appears in Marvel Powers United VR, voiced again by Isaac C. Singleton Jr.
 Thanos appears in Marvel Ultimate Alliance 3: The Black Order, voiced again by Isaac C. Singleton Jr.
 Thanos appears as a playable character in Marvel Strike Force.
 Two versions of Thanos from different alternate realities appear in Marvel Future Revolution, voiced again by Isaac C. Singleton Jr.

Novels
 Thanos appears in the 2017 novel, Thanos: Death Sentence by Stuart Moore. The book follows Thanos' last chance to win Death's love after his defeat at the end of The Infinity Gauntlet.
 Thanos appears in the 2018 novel, Thanos: Titan Consumed, by Barry Lyga.

Collected editions
A number of the stories featuring Thanos have been republished into trade paperbacks and other collected editions:

 The Life of Captain Marvel (collects Iron Man #55, Captain Marvel #25–34, Marvel Feature #12), 1991, 
 Essential Avengers: Volume 6 (includes Captain Marvel #33; The Avengers #125, 135), 576 pages, February 2008, 
 The Greatest Battles of the Avengers (includes Avengers Annual #7), 156 pages, December 1993, 
 Avengers vs. Thanos (collects Iron-Man #55, Captain Marvel #25–33, Marvel Feature #12, Daredevil #105–107, Avengers #125, Warlock #9-11, 15, Avengers Annual #7, Marvel Two-In-One Annual #2, and material from Logan's Run #6), 472 pages, March 2013, 
 Essential Marvel Two-in-One: Volume 2 (includes Marvel Two-in-One Annual #2), 568 pages, July 2007, 
 Marvel Masterworks Captain Marvel: Volume 3 (collects Captain Marvel #22–33, Iron Man #55), 288 pages, hardcover, April 2008, 
 Marvel Masterworks Captain Marvel: Volume 6 (collects Captain Marvel #58–62, Marvel Spotlight #1–4, 8, Marvel Super-Heroes #3, Marvel Graphic Novel #1; Logan's Run #63), 296 pages, hardcover, May 2016, 
 Marvel Masterworks Warlock: Volume 2 (collects Strange Tales #178–181; Warlock #9–15; Avengers Annual #7; Marvel Two-in-One Annual #2), hardcover, 320 pages, hardcover, June 2009, 
 The Death of Captain Marvel (collects Captain Marvel #34, Marvel Spotlight #1–2, Marvel Graphic Novel #1), 128 pages, hardcover, June 2010, 
 Silver Surfer: Rebirth of Thanos (collects Silver Surfer #34-38 and Yule Memory from Marvel Holiday Special 1992 by Jim Starlin, Ron Lim, Terry Austin), 128 pages, April 1993,  
 The Thanos Quest:
 Volume 1 (The Thanos Quest) miniseries #1-3, 1990-1991 (caution, later printings of this edition have poor quality) 
 Volume 2 (The Thanos Quest) miniseries #4-6, 1990-1991 (caution, later printings of this edition have poor quality)   
 Silver Surfer: Rebirth of Thanos (collects Silver Surfer #34–38; The Thanos Quest miniseries; "The Final Flower!" from Logan's Run #6), 224 pages, April 2006,  (hardcover, August 2010)
 The Infinity Gauntlet (collects The Infinity Gauntlet limited series), 256 pages, March 2000,  (December 2004, ; July 2006, ; hardcover, August 2010)
 Infinity War (collects Infinity War limited series; Warlock and the Infinity Watch #7–10; Marvel Comics Presents #108–111), 400 pages, April 2006, 
 Infinity Crusade:
 Volume 1 (collects Infinity Crusade #1–3, Warlock Chronicles #1–3, Warlock and the Infinity Watch #18–19), 248 pages, December 2008, 
 Volume 2 (collects Infinity Crusade #4–6, Warlock Chronicles #4–5, Warlock and the Infinity Watch #20–22), 248 pages, February 2009, 
 Thor: Blood and Thunder (collects Thor #468–471, Silver Surfer #86–88, Warlock Chronicles #6–8, Warlock and the Infinity Watch #23–25), 336 pages, July 2011, 
 DC versus Marvel Comics (collects DC vs. Marvel mini-series, Doctor Strangefate #1), 163 pages, September 1996, 
 Ka-Zar by Mark Waid and Andy Kubert:
 Volume 1 (collects Ka-Zar #1–7, Tales of the Marvel Universe #1), 208 pages, January 2011, 
 Volume 2 (collects Ka-Zar #8–14, Annual '97), 216 pages, March 2011, 
 Deadpool Classic: Volume 5 (collects Deadpool #26–33, Baby's First Deadpool, Deadpool Team-Up #1), 272 pages, June 2011, 
 The Mighty Thor by Dan Jurgens and John Romita Jr.: Volume 4 (collects Thor vol. 2, #18–25, Annual 2000), 256 pages, November 2010, 
 Infinity Abyss (collects Infinity Abyss limited series), 176 pages, 2003, 
 Thanos: The End (collects Marvel: The End limited series), 160 pages, May 2004, 
 Thanos: Redemption (collects Thanos #1–12), 304 pages, November 2013, 
 Epiphany (collects Thanos Vol. 1  #1–6), 144 pages, June 2004, 
 Samaritan (collects Thanos Vol. 1 #7–12), 144 pages, October 2004, 
 Annihilation:
 Volume 1 (collects Drax the Destroyer miniseries, Annihilation: Prologue one-shot, Annihilation: Nova miniseries), 256 pages, October 2007,  (hardcover, March 2007)
 Volume 2 (collects Annihilation: Ronan miniseries, Annihilation: Silver Surfer miniseries, Annihilation: Super-Skrull miniseries), 320 pages, November 2007,  (hardcover, May 2007)
 Volume 3 (collects Annihilation: The Nova Corps Files one-shot/handbook, Annihilation limited series, Annihilation: Heralds of Galactus miniseries), 304 pages, December 2007,  (hardcover, July 2007)
 The Thanos Imperative (collects The Thanos Imperative #1–6, The Thanos Imperative: Ignition, The Thanos Imperative: Devastation, Thanos Sourcebook), 248 pages, hardcover, February 2011, 
 Infinity (collects Infinity #1–6, New Avengers vol. 3, #7–12, Avengers vol 5, #14–23, Infinity: Against the Tide Infinite Comic #1–2), 632 pages, hardcover, February 2014, 
 Thanos Rising (collects Thanos Rising #1–5), 136 pages, hardcover, July 2014, 
 Thanos: A God Up There Listening (collects Thanos: A God Up There Listening #1–4 and Thanos Annual #1), 120 pages, hardcover, December 2014, 
 Thanos vs. Hulk (collects Thanos vs. Hulk #1–4, Warlock (1972) #12), 112 pages, June 2015, 
 Thanos: Cosmic Powers (collects Secret Defenders #12–14, Cosmic Powers #1–6), 344 pages, November 2015, 
 Deadpool vs. Thanos (collects Deadpool vs. Thanos #1–4), 112 pages, December 2015, 
 The Infinity Gauntlet: Warzones! (collects The Infinity Gauntlet #1–5), 112 pages, December 2015, 
 Siege: Battleworld (collects Siege #1–4, Uncanny X-Men (2011) #9–10), 144 pages, February 2016, 
 Secret Wars (collects Secret Wars #1–9 and material from Secret Wars #0 FCBD), 312 pages, March 2016, 
 The Infinity Entity (collects: The Infinity Entity #1–4, Thanos Annual #1), 116 pages, July 2016, '
 Thanos The Infinity Revelation, Jim Starlin, 2014, 
 Thanos The Infinity Relativity, Jim Starlin, 2015, 
 Thanos The Infinity Finale, Jim Starlin, 2016, 
 Thanos returns (collects Thanos Vol 2 #1-5), 136 pages, by Jeff Lemire, 2017 
 Thanos Vol. 2: The God Quarry (collects Thanos Vol 2 #7-11), Jeff Lemire 2018, 
 Thanos Wins (collects THANOS Vol 2 #13-18, THANOS ANNUAL 1), Donny Cates 2018,

References

External links

 
 
 Thanos at the Marvel Directory
 
 Thanos at Marvel Cinematic Universe Wiki

Action film villains
Villains in animated television series
Characters created by Jim Starlin
Characters created by Mike Friedrich
Comics characters introduced in 1973
Eternals (comics)
Fictional characters from the Solar System
Fictional characters who can manipulate reality
Fictional characters who can manipulate time
Fictional characters with dimensional travel abilities
Fictional characters with elemental transmutation abilities
Fictional characters with energy-manipulation abilities
Fictional characters with immortality
Fictional characters with superhuman durability or invulnerability
Fictional filicides
Fictional mass murderers
Fictional matricides
Fictional warlords
Galactic emperors
Male characters in film
Marvel Comics aliens
Marvel Comics characters who can move at superhuman speeds
Marvel Comics characters who can teleport
Marvel Comics characters who have mental powers
Marvel Comics characters with superhuman strength
Marvel Comics extraterrestrial supervillains
Marvel Comics film characters
Marvel Comics Deviants
Marvel Comics male supervillains
Marvel Comics telekinetics
Marvel Comics telepaths
Time travelers